Scopula apicipunctata is a moth of the family Geometridae. It was described by Hugo Theodor Christoph in 1881. It is found in Siberia, the Kuriles and Japan.

References

Moths described in 1881
apicipunctata
Moths of Asia